Nikola Burić (born 1 October 1996) is a Croatian professional footballer who plays as a forward for Italian  club Novara.

Club career
Formed on GNK Dinamo Zagreb Academy, Burić made his debut for the second team on 7 October 2016 against HNK Gorica. He spend most part of his career on his country in Croatian Second Football League clubs. 

On 1 February 2021, he joined to Italian Serie Cclub Legnago Salus.

On 9 July 2022, he moved to Novara.

References

External links
 
 

1996 births
Living people
Footballers from Zagreb
Association football forwards
Croatian footballers
GNK Dinamo Zagreb II players
NK Rudeš players
NK Novigrad players
NK Kustošija players
NK Lokomotiva Zagreb players
F.C. Legnago Salus players
Novara F.C. players
Croatian Football League players
First Football League (Croatia) players
Serie C players
Croatian expatriate footballers
Expatriate footballers in Italy
Croatian expatriate sportspeople in Italy